Charles Kane may refer to:

Charles Kane, a character in Tomb Raider Chronicles
Charles Foster Kane, the protagonist of the film Citizen Kane
Charles Kane (business executive), president & chief operating officer of the OLPC Association
Charlie Kane (boxer) (born 1968), British Olympic boxer
Charles L. Kane (born 1963), theoretical physicist